Yasser Marta (born July 28, 1996) is a Filipino actor, singer and model. He was one of the members of GMA’s all-male group One Up.

Personal life 
Marta was born in Las Piñas to a Filipino mom and Portuguese father. He studies at Lyceum of the Philippines University. He started showbiz when he joined Eat Bulaga’s segment, Spogify. He then bagged minor roles in GMA Network shows and became part of GMA’s boyband, One Up.

Filmography

Television

References 
 'Spogify' grand finalist Yasser Marta, very passionate daw kapag in love. Retrieved 2017-06-29
 ONE UP YASSER MARTA SPOGIFY EAT BULAGA POP STAR KIDS STARSTRUCK TO THE TOP GMA ARTIST CENTER GMA KAPUSO BOYBAND 1 Retrieved 2017-06-29

1996 births
Living people
Filipino male television actors
21st-century Filipino male singers
Filipino male models
GMA Network personalities
People from Las Piñas
Male actors from Metro Manila
Filipino people of Portuguese descent